Frank Schalow (born February 23, 1956) is an American philosopher and professor of philosophy and university research professor at the University of New Orleans. He is known for his exegesis of Martin Heidegger's writings. He is a co-editor of, the journal  Heidegger Studies.

Books
 Departures: At the Crossroads between Heidegger and Kant (Berlin and Boston: de Gruyter Publishers, 2013)
 Historical Dictionary of Heidegger’s Philosophy, 2nd edition (Lanham, MD: Scarecrow Press, 2010), Co-authored with Alfred Denker
 The Incarnality of Being: The Earth, Animals, and the Body in Heidegger’s Thought (Albany, NY: SUNY Press, 2006)
 Heidegger and the Quest for the Sacred: From Thought to the Sanctuary of Faith (Dordrecht: Kluwer Academic Publishers, 2001)
 Language and Deed: Rediscovering Politics through Heidegger’s Encounter with German Idealism (Amsterdam and Atlanta: Editions Rodopi, 1998)
 The Renewal of the Heidegger-Kant Dialogue: Action, Thought, and Responsibility (Albany: State University of New York Press, 1992)
 Traces of Understanding: A Profile of Heidegger’s and Ricoeur’s Hermeneutics (Amsterdam and Atlanta: Editions Rodopi, 1990), Co-authored with Patrick L. Bourgeois
 Imagination and Existence: Heidegger’s Retrieval of the Kantian Ethic (Lanham, MD: University Press of America, 1986)
 Heidegger, Translation, and the Task of Thinking: Essays in Honor of Parvis Emad (ed.) (2011)
 The Linguistic Dimension of Kant's Thought: Historical and Critical Essays, edited by Frank Schalow and Richard Velkley (Northwestern University Press, 2014).

References

External links
"Heidegger: Uncensored."

20th-century German philosophers
21st-century German philosophers
Phenomenologists
Continental philosophers
Philosophy academics
Heidegger scholars
Living people
1956 births
University of New Orleans faculty
University of Denver alumni
Tulane University alumni
German–English translators
21st-century translators
Translators of philosophy
Translators of Martin Heidegger